A symplectic space may refer to:
 Symplectic manifold
 Symplectic vector space

Differential geometry
Differential topology
Symplectic geometry